Finest Kind is a folk music trio based in Ottawa, Ontario, Canada. It consists of Ian Robb, Ann Downey and Shelley Posen. The band is known for its three-part harmony renditions of traditional folk songs.

History
Finest Kind formed in the early 1990s.  The band has released six albums in its own name, including Heart's Delight in 1999 and Silks & Spices in 2004. The three also recorded a Christmas album with Canadian actor John D. Huston. Individually, its members have appeared on several solo albums and play with other bands.

Finest Kind performed throughout North America and the United Kingdom for folk song societies, community groups, and at folk festivals, including the Ottawa Folk Festival.

In 2014 Finest Kind performed at the Canadian Folk Music Awards gala in Ottawa. The band retired from touring in 2015. It continues to perform an annual Christmas concert and other engagements in the Ottawa area.

CD recordings
  Lost in a Song 1996
  Heart's Delight 1999
  Silks and Spices 2004
  Feasts & Spirits (with John D. Huston) 2004
  For Honour and For Gain 2010
  From Shore to Shore 2014

References

External links
 

Musical groups with year of establishment missing
Musical groups from Ottawa
Canadian folk music groups